George A Danos (Greek: Γιώργος Α Δανός) is a Cypriot space scientist, engineer, astronomer, entrepreneur and science communicator. He is a graduate and eminent alumnus of Imperial College London. He is the President of the Cyprus Space Exploration Organisation (CSEO) and the President of the Parallel Parliament for Entrepreneurship of the Republic of Cyprus.

He is Honorary Member of the International Astronomical Union (IAU), in recognition to his significant contributions to the progress of astronomy, and Vice-chair of the international Committee on Space Research Panel on Innovative Solutions.

He led several societies, groups, companies and organisations in the UK, Cyprus, Ireland, and in Europe and internationally.

Early career 
Whilst a student, he was President of the Imperial College Students for the Exploration and Development of Space (IC-SEDS) and Board Member of UK-SEDS.

Whilst aged 27, he became Founder and Chief Technical Officer of Virgin Biznet, one of most lucrative business ventures of Sir Richard Branson's Virgin Group, after pitching at the “House” of Richard Branson.

In 1996 he was part of the team that brought Virgin Radio's broadcast to the internet, making it the first European radio station to simulcast their live program 24-hours a day on the internet.

Space exploration

Space exploration in Cyprus 
In 2013 he was elected President of the Cyprus Space Exploration Organisation (CSEO), a position he continues to hold.

As President of CSEO, he led the national campaign that saw Cyprus join the European Space Agency, as a PECS Member.

He mentored and nurtured the local space community of Cyprus that saw notable achievements and multiple awards won by many teams of CSEO, and brokered many international agreements with international synergies and space research projects.

Involvement in international space exploration 
He is Council Member – the highest governing body – of the international Committee on Space Research (COSPAR). In October 2020, he was appointed as Vice-chair of COSPAR's Panel on Innovative Solutions (PoIS) (see below for details in this role).

He is representing the Republic of Cyprus to the Global Experts Group on Sustainable Lunar Activities (GEGSLA).

He is the official representative of Cyprus to COSPAR  and as President of CSEO – the National Member to the International Astronomical Union (IAU) – he is also the official representative of Cyprus to the IAU. He is also the official representative of CSEO to the International Astronautical Federation (IAF).

He serves as Chair of the Analogue Working Group of the Moon Village Association (MVA) and as Middle East & Africa Regional Coordinator for the MVA.

During the 70th International Astronautical Congress held in Washington, D.C., as a panelist of the "Martian and Lunar Analogues" Global Networking Forum, he announced the International Moon Analogue Consortium.

COSPAR - Artificial Intelligence and Space Weather prediction 
As vice-chair of the COSPAR Panel on Innovative Solutions (PoIS) he managed the creation of the Space Innovation Lab of COSPAR, bridging the science of space weather with the engineering tools of artificial intelligence, analyzing space weather data and potentially predicting dangerous storms heading towards our planet and raising a warning alarm if needed.

During the 44th COSPAR General Assembly in July 2022, as Main Scientific Organizer (MSO) of the PoIS.2 panel session, he led the effort of bridging global industry and scientific community, towards the above goals.

Recognition - International Academy of Astronautics (IAA) 
In recognition of his contributions and achievements in promoting astronautics and space exploration he was elected Corresponding Member and Academician of the International Academy of Astronautics.

Recognition - International Astronomical Union (IAU) 
The International Astronomical Union (IAU) selected him as Honorary Member of the IAU, in recognition to his significant contributions to the progress of astronomy, including leading campaigns that saw Cyprus join ESA, the IAU and COSPAR, as well as establishing the Cyprus Space Centre and helping Cyprus be selected as an International Astronomy Education Centre of the IAU Office for Astronomy Education (OAE).

Science communicator 
He is a science communicator and advocate of solar system and space exploration.

He gave many presentations worldwide, including a TEDx talk, and he is the presenter of the "2030: SpaceWorks" global webinars, with a viewership of over 80,000 people worldwide.

Parallel Parliament of the Republic of Cyprus 
He served for one year (Nov 2019 - Oct 2020) as Dean and M.P. of the Parallel Parliament for Research, Innovation and Digital Governance of the Republic of Cyprus.

In October 2020, he was elected President of the Parallel Parliament for Entrepreneurship of the Republic of Cyprus.

Notable positions 

 Aug 2021 - Honorary Member of the International Astronomical Union (IAU).
Feb 2021 - Representative of the Republic of Cyprus to the Global Experts Group on Sustainable Lunar Activities (GEGSLA).
Oct 2020 - President of the Parallel Parliament for Entrepreneurship of the Republic of Cyprus.
 Oct 2020 - Vice-chair of the Panel on Innovative Solutions (PoIS) of the international Committee on Space Research (COSPAR).
 Nov 2019 - Dean of the Parallel Parliament for Research, Innovation and Digital Governance of the Republic of Cyprus.
 Sep 2019 - Middle East & Africa Regional Coordinator of the Moon Village Association (MVA).
 Jun 2018 - Chair of the Analogue Working Group of the Moon Village Association (MVA).
Mar 2018 - Corresponding Member and Academician of the International Academy of Astronautics (IAA).
 Dec 2016 - Council Member of the international Committee on Space Research (COSPAR).
 Oct 2013 - President of the Cyprus Space Exploration Organisation (CSEO).
 May 1999 - Founder and Chief Technical Officer of Virgin Biznet.
Oct 1992 - Board Member of the United Kingdom Students for the Exploration and Development of Space (UK-SEDS).
Oct 1991 - President of the Imperial College Students for the Exploration and Development of Space (IC-SEDS).

References 

Living people
Year of birth missing (living people)
Cypriot scientists
21st-century astronomers
Amateur astronomers
Space scientists